Plec may refer to:
 Plecostomus, several species from the catfish family Loricariidae. Commonly abbreviated to "plec" and "pleco" in the aquarium trade
 Plectrum, a device for plucking or strumming a stringed instrument
 Plec, Poland
 Pleck in the UK